The Portuguese Bend region is the largest area of natural vegetation remaining on the Palos Verdes Peninsula, in Los Angeles County, California.
Though once slated for development including the projected route of Crenshaw Boulevard, the area is geologically unstable and is unsuitable for building.

History of inhabitants

Native Americans
The peninsula was the homeland of the Tongva-Gabrieliño Native Americans. In other areas of the Los Angeles Basin archeological sites date back 8,000 years. Their first contact with Europeans was in 1542 with João Cabrilho (Juan Cabrillo), the explorer who also was the first to write of them. Chowigna and Suangna were two Tongva settlements of many in the peninsula area, which was also a departure point for their rancherias on the Channel Islands.

Spanish and Mexican era
In 1846 Jose Dolores Sepulveda and José Loreto received a Mexican land grant from Alta California Governor Pío Pico for a parcel from the huge original 1784 Spanish land grant Rancho San Pedro of Manuel Dominguez.[6] It was named Rancho de los Palos Verdes, or "ranch of the green sticks", which was used primarily as a cattle ranch.[7]

American era
By 1882 ownership of the land had passed from the Sepulveda through various mortgage holders to Jotham Bixby of Rancho Los Cerritos, who leased the land to Japanese farmers. Early in the 20th century most of Bixby's land was sold to a consortium of New York investors who created The Palos Verdes Project and began marketing land on the peninsula for small horse ranches and residential communities.

The whaling era
The name Portuguese Bend comes from the whaling activities of Portuguese whalemen from the Azores. An Azorean shore whaling captain named  José Machado brought shore whaling to this bend in the coastline north of San Pedro Bay after the closure of the San Pedro Bay whaling station on Deadman's Island in or about 1862. He brought with him a crew of Azorean whalemen. In 1864, Captain Clark moved his operations to San Simeon Bay.
In 1869, the station was operated by the John Brown Whaling Company (Los Angeles Star, March 13, 1869). In 1874, Captain Frank Anderson (né Anasio) brought a crew from Port Harford in San Luis Obispo County. His operation at Portuguese Bend lasted from 1874 to 1877. During three winters (December–April) he obtained 2,166 barrels of oil from trying out the blubber flensed from gray whales he had caught on their annual migration along the California coast. He abandoned the station thereafter, establishing another further north at Pigeon Point. An 1888 U.S. Fish Commission Report stated that whales had been caught from Portuguese Bend as late as 1884, suggesting another party utilized the area for whaling up until that date.
 The Old Whaling Station there was designated a California Historic Landmark (No.381) on Jan. 3, 1944.

The Vanderlip era
Frank A. Vanderlip, Sr. (November 17, 1864 - June 30, 1937) was known as the "Father of Palos Verdes". He purchased the 16,000 acre Rancho de los Palos Verdes from Jotham Bixby in 1913. In 1916, he built the Vanderlip estates near the Portuguese Bend area of Palos Verdes, California. His daughter-in-law Elin Vanderlip maintained residence at the estate until her death in 2009 and her husband's ashes are spread on the grounds. The Vanderlips championed many of the landmarks in Rancho Palos Verdes, notably Wayfarers Chapel (The church was designed by Lloyd Wright (son of Frank Lloyd Wright) in the late 1940s and was built between 1949 and 1951.), Marineland of the Pacific, Portuguese Bend Riding Club (featured in the movie Chinatown), Marymount College, Palos Verdes and Chadwick School.[7]
In 1949 Kelvin Cox Vanderlip, Sr. built the Portuguese Bend Beach Club (a gated beach house community The houses were built on lots leased for 25 years and were the typical 1940s weekend places where people went to have a quiet time at the beach. Back then there was a clubhouse, restaurant, paddle tennis courts, 50 foot swimming pool, a sandy beach, and a 485 foot long pier where boats could tie up.

Geology and landslides

During the late Pleistocene, the Palos Verdes hills were an offshore island. The island later became a peninsula, when the region between the island and the mainland filled with alluvial deposits from the mountain ranges near the Los Angeles basin. The Palos Verdes Hills are part of an uplifted block, with a northwest trend, bounded on the northeast by the Palos Verdes fault zone. Most of the movement along this fault is dip-slip, resulting in an uplift of about 1 km of the Palos Verdes Hills relative to the Los Angeles basin.

Surficial deposits
Surficial deposits of the Palos Verdes Hills consists of stratigraphic layers, in order from oldest to youngest: 
Late Pleistocene stream terrace gravel
Late Pleistocene marine terrace deposits
Late Quaternary dune sand
Late Quaternary soil
Late Quaternary talus
Late Quaternary non-marine terrace cover
Late Quaternary slope wash and creep deposits
Holocene beach deposits
Holocene alluvium.

The ground surface in the central and southern parts of the district is low and hummocky, reflecting the location of numerous late Quaternary landslides. These hills form an elongated topographic dome that rises from sea level to altitudes of more than 430 meters.

Historical landslides
The Palos Verdes Landslide has been conducive to ground failure for approximately 250,000 years. The ground failure over the years has been due to seaward-dipping strata, rock weakness and continual coastal erosion. Prehistoric landslides are believed to be so extensive that they destroyed the formation of higher wave-cut benches. The active slide consists of landslide rubble such as bedded blocks, which are rare among most landslides. The bedded blocks measure ten feet (3 meters) in diameter and they appear in landslide rubble. This shows ground disturbance which could eventually cause the land to slide.

Modern landslides

Though the Portuguese Bend area had a history of landslides going back 250,000 years and had been officially mapped as a landslide complex before the 1950s,
current slippage in the Portuguese Bend area began in 1956, coincident with the construction of a road (the Crenshaw Boulevard extension, south of Crest Road) along the top of the ancient landslide complex. During this construction, excavated sediment was dumped onto the upper slopes of the complex along with hundreds of thousands of gallons of water which lubricated a layer of bentonite clay formed by the subsurface weathering of volcanic rock called tuff. This layer of bentonite slants down to the Pacific ocean enabling down-slope movement which continues to the present.  A 1958 video newsreel was shot of the effects of the movement on the homes in the area.  A successful suit was filed by area homeowners in 1961, winning $10 million in compensation against Los Angeles County, the party responsible for the road construction.  Another possible contributing cause of the sliding was the construction of hundreds of homes on and above the unstable rock and soil in the early 1950s prior to the slide.   Each home had its own sewage treatment facility (cesspool or septic system) and home owners established lawns and gardens on their properties.  Some homes were damaged, but others remain intact. Homes which remain occupied now have water and sewage lines available to them. The new lines were constructed above ground, so the slide can move freely below them.

Description and characterization
The first movement indication occurred on Friday, August 17, 1956. Cracking occurred in the foundation of a recently built structure. The cracks were repaired, but new cracking occurred just days later. Ten days after the first indication of movement, cracking propagated to Palos Verdes Drive South. By September 4, an offset of 4 inches (10 cm) was observed on the road. By mid-September, more pronounced cracking was observed. Distortion became noticeable on the Portuguese Bend pier on October 4 of that year. A survey station was installed to monitor ground movement. The station recorded movement of 3 to 4 inches (≈7 to 10 cm) per day. By the end of October, movement slowed to ≈¾ inch (2 cm) per day. The amount it moves is unknown today. Drilling projects over the next several months determined the location of the slip surface, and the location of standing groundwater.

The major part of the landslide consists of severely broken rubble. Individual rock fragments appear to be from the middle and upper units of the Altamira Shale, consisting of tuffaceous and silty shale. Fractured blocks of diatomaceous shale are found on the south slope of Blakesley HIll. Individual fragments of chert and cherty shale are found throughout the slide, though they are more abundant west of Portuguese Canyon. At the toe of the slide, between Inspiration Point and Portuguese Point, are weathered boulders of basalt.

Drainage within the Portuguese Bend district is characterized by a prevailing southward flow. Several canyons cross the district and act as the primary drainage features, including the Altamira and Portuguese Canyons. These canyons trend southward through the slide complex. Drainage is controlled locally by landslide-related features, such as resistant landslide blocks or channels cut in softer zones.

Habitat

The geographical location and geological history of the peninsula make the remaining habitat extremely valuable for ecological and other scientific reasons. The peninsula, which was an island with the Palos Verdes Hills in recent geological time, has close floral and faunal similarities to the Channel Islands. This feature makes the Portuguese Bend Landslide area a natural research laboratory for the study of island biogeography and evolutionary ecology.

The vegetation found in the area is coastal sage scrub. This plant community supports a surprising number and variety of species.  There are at least three races of birds resident on the peninsula that are found nowhere else except the Channel Islands.  These are the insular forms of the orange-crowned warbler, Pacific-slope flycatcher, and Allen's hummingbird. The same phenomenon has been documented for plant species. A species of live-forever, Dudleya virens, which is native to the Channel Islands and the Palos Verdes Peninsula, is found near Point Vicente Lighthouse.

The area also serves as habitat to many migrating birds moving through the region in fall and spring. The Peninsula is a headland that juts into the Pacific Ocean several miles further than the surrounding coastline. Migrating terrestrial and shore birds, flying over the open ocean on their north-south migration along the Pacific Flyway, spot this headland and stop to rest and feed. Many of these birds will stay and spend the winter in the area. Thus, the geographic position makes this habitat much more important than might otherwise be expected.

In general, the area has been lightly disturbed, and much natural vegetation remains. Intense disturbances, in the form of heavy off-road vehicle and pedestrian use, have been limited. Grazing also took place at one time.

In popular culture
The fictional Santa Rosita Beach State Park, with its signature crisscrossed palm trees comprising "the Big W" amidst lush surroundings and featured in the 1963 comedy It's a Mad, Mad, Mad, Mad World, was a landscaped set built in 1962 in the backyard of the Harden Gatehouse on Palos Verdes Dr. S, in Rancho Palos Verdes. As of 2016, all of the "Big W" palms were gone.

References

Further reading
Vonder Linden, Karl. "The Portuguese Bend Landslide." Engineering Geology, December 1989, Vol. 27, Issue 1-4, pp. 301–373

External links
CSULB.edu: Geological Information on Portuguese Bend 
Palos Verdes Peninsula Land Conservancy Project
Youtube: Newsreel by Universal-International News entitled "Somber Spring - Coastal Earthslides, Rains and Floods"

Palos Verdes Peninsula
Geography of Los Angeles County, California
Geology of California
Portuguese-American culture in California
Landslides in the United States